The greater cane rat (Thryonomys swinderianus), also known as the grasscutter (in Ghana, Nigeria and other regions of West Africa), is one of two species of cane rats, a small family of African hystricognath rodents. It lives by reed-beds and riverbanks in Sub-Saharan Africa.

Description

They are considered one of the largest rodents in Africa, behind only the Hystrix porcupines. It has rounded ears, a short nose, and coarse bristly hair. Its forefeet are smaller than its hind feet, each with three toes.

Behaviour
Cane rats live in small groups led by a single male. They are nocturnal and make nests from grasses or burrow underground. Individuals of the species may live in excess of four years. If frightened, they grunt and run towards water.

Interactions with humans
As humans expanded into the cane rat's native habitats, the cane rats likewise expanded from their native reeds into the plantations, particularly the sugar cane plantations from which they derive their name. Their tendency to adopt plantations as habitat, where they feed on agricultural crops such as maize, wheat, sugar-cane and cassava, often earns them the label of agricultural pest. However, the peoples of the region also utilize the cane rat as a food source (as bushmeat), considering the meat a delicacy. Consequently, these rats are beginning to be raised in cages for sale.

References 

Matthews, Jaman.  "The Value of Grasscutters," World Ark, (January–February, 2008), pp. 23–24.

External links 
BBC article on "grasscutter" rearing in Ghana
"The New Livestock: Rodents of Unusual Size in Heifer Projects in Ghana" in World Ark, August, 2012 | Heifer.org

Hystricognath rodents
Rodents of Africa
Mammals of West Africa
Mammals of Zambia
Thryonomys
Mammals described in 1827